Julie F. Barcelona is a Filipina botanist and taxonomist working as Research Associate at University of Canterbury (Christchurch, New Zealand). She is mostly known for her research on the Philippine members of the genus Rafflesia.

Barcelona worked on Co's Digital Flora of the Philippines, a website dedicated to the great Philippine botanist Leonard Co.

Barcelona is married to Pieter B. Pelser, with which she wrote most of her work. The pitcher plant species Nepenthes barcelonae was named after her.

Publications

 Barcelona, J.F., Pieter B. Pelser & M.O. Cajano. 2007. Rafflesia banahaw (Rafflesiaceae), a new species from Luzon, Philippines. Blumea 52: 345–350.
 Barcelona, J.F., P.B. Pelser, E.M. Cabutaje & N.A. Bartolome. 2008. Another new species of Rafflesia (Rafflesiaceae) from Luzon, Philippines: R. leonardi. Blumea 53: 223–228.
 Barcelona, J.F., P.B. Pelser, Danilo S. Balete & Leonard Co. 2009. Taxonomy, ecology, and conservation status of Philippine Rafflesia (Rafflesiaceae). Blumea 54: 77–93.
 Balete, D.S., P.B. Pelser, Daniel Lee Nickrent & J.F. Barcelona. 2010. Rafflesia verrucosa (Rafflesiaceae), a new species of small-flowered Rafflesia from eastern Mindanao, Philippines. Phytotaxa 10: 49–57.
 Barcelona, J.F., E.S. Fernando, D.L. Nickrent, D.S. Balete & P.B. Pelser. 2011. An amended description of Rafflesia leonardi and a revised key to Philippine Rafflesia (Rafflesiaceae). Phytotaxa 24: 11–18.
 
 Pelser, P.B., D.L. Nickrent, J.R.C. Callado & J.F. Barcelona. 2013. Mt. Banahaw reveals: The resurrection and neotypification of the name Rafflesia lagascae (Rafflesiaceae) and clues to the dispersal of Rafflesia seeds Phytotaxa 131: 35–40.
 pdf
 
 Pelser, P.B., D.N. Tandang & J.F. Barcelona. 2014. Balanophora coralliformis (Balanophoraceae), a new species from Mt. Mingan, Luzon, Philippines. Phytotaxa 170: 291–295.

References

External links
 Co's Digital Flora of the Philippines
 http://juliebarcelona.blogspot.com/
 

Women botanists
Year of birth missing (living people)
Living people
20th-century Filipino  botanists
20th-century Filipino women scientists
Miami University alumni
Academic staff of the University of Canterbury